Mic City Sons is the third and final album by American indie rock band Heatmiser, released on October 29, 1996 through record label Caroline.

Recording 
Mic City Sons is the band's only recording for a major label. However, when individuals at Virgin Records learned the band might be on the verge of disbanding, the album was subsequently licensed for release through the smaller sister independent label Caroline Records (also an EMI subsidiary) and their independent distributor of the same name.

Content 
The title of the album is taken from a line in the ninth track, "Pop in G": "Mic city sons seem to dumb everything down".

On the album's style, Michael Frey of AllMusic noted "a decidedly more pop feel than its predecessors".

Release 
Mic City Sons was released on October 29, 1996 through Virgin Records sub-label Caroline.

Reception 

Michael Frey of AllMusic called the album "an outstanding collection of diverse and invigorating tracks". Tracks "Pop in G" and "See You Later" were called "two of the best indie rock songs of the '90s". He finished by saying "Despite the success Heatmiser's members have achieved since their disbanding, it's unfortunate that this collective decided to split up just when they had reached such a creative peak."

Track listing

Personnel 

 Heatmiser

 Sam Coomes – bass guitar
 Neil Gust – vocals, guitar, sleeve design and photography
 Tony Lash – drums, sleeve photography, mixing ("Rest My Head Against the Wall")
 Elliott Smith – vocals, guitar

 Additional personnel

 Aaron Day – additional vocals ("Get Lucky")
 Sean Croghan – backing vocals ("Cruel Reminder")

 Technical
 Rob Schnapf – mixing (all except track 4)
 Tom Rothrock – mixing (all except track 4)
 Steve Marcussen – mastering
 Storm Tharp – sleeve photography

References

External links 
 

1996 albums
Heatmiser albums
Caroline Records albums
Albums produced by Tom Rothrock
Albums produced by Rob Schnapf